Eustathes mindanaonis is a species of beetle in the family Cerambycidae. It was described by Vives in 2009. It is known from the Philippines.

References

Astathini
Beetles described in 2009